Hastrman (also known as The Hastrman) is a 2018 Czech romantic thriller film directed by Ondřej Havelka. It is based on a novel of the same name by Miloš Urban. It is Havelka's first film as director. It premiered at the Finále Plzeň Film Festival 2018.

Cast

 Karel Dobrý as Baron de Casus
 Simona Zmrzlá as Katynka
 Jiří Lábus as Baron's servant Francl
 Jan Kolařík as Priest Fidelius
 Jiří Maryško as Teacher Voves
 David Novotný as Katynka's father Kolář
 Vladimír Polívka as Jakub
 Norbert Lichý
 Vojtěch Hrabák
 Andrea Berecková
 Jan Komínek
 Anna Kratochvílová
 Ivan Sochor

Reception
The film received mixed to positive reviews from Czech critics. It holds a 65% score at the Kinobox aggregator. It won four awards at the 2018 Czech Lion Awards, including Best Actor.

References

External links
 
 

2018 films
2010s romantic thriller films
Czech romantic thriller films
2010s Czech-language films
Czech Lion Awards winners (films)